The Silent Flyer is a 1926 10-episode (chapter) American adventure film serial directed by William James Craft.  The film serial was sold to Universal Pictures for $75,000 with the resulting funds used in the founding of Mascot Pictures.

Plot
Scientist Benjamin Darrell (Anders Randolf) has invented a silent aircraft motor of tremendous potential benefit to aeronautical and military concerns. A plot is underway to steal the invention.

Lloyd Darrell (Malcolm McGregor), a secret service agent, disguises himself as Bill Smith and covertly endeavors to prevent the theft. Together with pretty Helen Corliss (Louise Lorraine), and most importantly, Silver Streak, a clever German shepherd, the trio serve to foil any criminals.

Chapter titles
The Jaws of Death
Dynamited
Waters of Death
The Treacherous Trail
Plunge of Peril
Flight of Honor
Under Arrest
Flames of Terror
Hurled Through Space
Love and Glory

Cast
 Malcolm McGregor as Lloyd Darrell, posing as Bill Smith
 Louise Lorraine as Helen Corliss
 George B. Williams as John Corliss (credited as George Williams)
 Albert J. Smith as Jack Hutchins
 Anders Randolf as Benjamin Darrell
 Edith Yorke as Mrs. Darrell
 Arthur Morrison
 Robert Walker
 Dorothy Tallcot (as Dorothy Talcott)
 Thur Fairfax
 Hughie Mack
 Silver Streak as Silver Streak, a dog

Production 
Enterprising producer Nat Levine shot the entire The Silent Flyer serial on location and on rented stages, managing to bring all 10 chapters in on a budget of 70,000 dollars. Instead of releasing his first serial on the usual "States Rights basis", Levine sold The Silent Flyer to Universal for 75,000 dollars, the profits going toward establishing Mascot Pictures, a Poverty Row film company that would continue the serial tradition into the "talkies" era.

Reception
The Silent Flyer, produced independently by the enterprising Nat Levine, was a low-budget 10-chapter action serial that featured Danish-born character actor Anders Randolph. Levine also introduced a four-footed star, Silver Streak, a clever German shepherd, that was his answer to Rin Tin Tin, a consistent money-maker for Warner Bros.

Preservation status
The Silent Flyer is considered to be a lost film. Only a trailer remains, resident at the UCLA Film and Television Archive.

See also
List of lost films

References

Notes

Citations

Bibliography

 Farmer, James H. Celluloid Wings: The Impact of Movies on Aviation. Blue Ridge Summit, Pennsylvania: Tab Books Inc., 1984. .
 Tuska, Jon. The Vanishing Legion: A History of Mascot Pictures, 1927-1935. Jefferson, North Carolina: McFarland & Company, 1999. .

External links
 
 
 

1926 films
1926 adventure films
1926 lost films
1920s English-language films
American black-and-white films
American silent serial films
American aviation films
Films directed by William James Craft
Films produced by Samuel Bischoff
Lost American films
Mascot Pictures film serials
American adventure films
Films produced by Nat Levine
Lost adventure films
1920s American films
Silent adventure films